Lukáš Kováč (born 21 June 1987) is a Slovak football midfielder who currently plays for FK Spišská Nová Ves.

References

External links
 FK Spišská Nová Ves official club profile 
 Futbalnet profile 
 
 Profile at spartak.sk 

1987 births
Living people
Slovak footballers
Association football midfielders
FC Spartak Trnava players
FC ViOn Zlaté Moravce players
FK Spišská Nová Ves players
Slovak Super Liga players
Sportspeople from Spišská Nová Ves